HMAS Bendigo (FCPB 211) was a  in the Royal Australian Navy (RAN).

Design and construction

Main propulsion machinery consisted of two MTU series 538TB91 V16 diesel engines, which supplied  to the two propeller shafts. Exhaust was not expelled through a funnel, like most ships, but through vents below the waterline.

The ship's company consisted of 22 personnel. Each patrol boat was armed with a single Bofors 40mm gun as main armament, supplemented by two .50-calibre Browning machineguns and an 81 mm mortar, although the mortar was removed from all ships sometime after 1988. The main weapon was originally to be two 30-mm guns on a twin-mount, but the reconditioned Bofors were selected to keep costs down; provision was made to install an updated weapon later in the class' service life, but this did not eventuate.

Bendigo was laid down by NQEA in Cairns, Queensland on 21 September 1981, launched on 9 April 1983, and commissioned on 28 May 1983.

Operational history

On 12 November 1998, Bendigo grounded on submerged rocks near Michaelmas Cay, 20 miles north of Cairns, while carrying 45 passengers for a Family Day cruise. There were no casualties and only minor damage to the patrol boat, which was refloated 35 minutes after the grounding, with the help of an Australian Volunteer Coast Guard boat.

On 16 July 1985, Bendigo  became the first patrol boat to circumnavigate Australia.

Fate
Bendigo was decommissioned on 9 September 2006. The patrol boat was broken up for scrap in Darwin during 2006 and 2007, at a cost of $450,000 to the Australian government.

Citations

References

 The chapter is available separately as Semaphore, Issue 17, 2005 in PDF and HTML formats.

External links
 RAN page for HMAS Bendigo (II)

Fremantle-class patrol boats
Ships built in Queensland
1983 ships